Beech Mountain Lakes is a census-designated place (CDP) in Butler Township, Luzerne County, Pennsylvania, United States. The population was 2,022 at the 2010 census.

Geography
The CDP consists of a housing development adjacent to an artificial lake in the valley of Nescopeck Creek. I-80 passes just north of the CDP. Exit 262 on I-80 serves PA 309, which runs past the western edge of the CDP.

Demographics

References

Census-designated places in Luzerne County, Pennsylvania
Census-designated places in Pennsylvania